Porte de Choisy is a station of the Paris Métro, serving Line 7 and Tramway Line 3a. It is named after the Porte de Choisy, a gate in the nineteenth century Thiers wall of Paris, which led to Choisy-le-Roi.

The station opened on 7 March 1930 as part of Line 10 when it was extended from Place d'Italie. The station was integrated into line 7 on 26 April 1931. In 2006, Paris Tramway Line 3 (now 3a) opened, with a stop at Porte de Choisy.

Station layout

Gallery

References

Paris Métro stations in the 13th arrondissement of Paris
Railway stations in France opened in 1930